John Bolton (died c.1426), was an English mercer and Member of Parliament.

He was a Member (MP) of the Parliament of England for City of York in 1399 and 1407. He was Mayor of York 3 Feb. 1410–11.

References

14th-century births
1426 deaths
14th-century English people
15th-century English people
Lord Mayors of York
People from York
Members of the Parliament of England (pre-1707)